Little House is a historic home located at Palisades in Rockland County, New York.  It was built in 1824 is a -story, three-bay, side-passage frame residence in the Federal style. Also on the property are two late-19th-century sheds.

It was listed on the National Register of Historic Places in 1990.

References

Houses on the National Register of Historic Places in New York (state)
Federal architecture in New York (state)
Houses completed in 1824
Houses in Rockland County, New York
National Register of Historic Places in Rockland County, New York